José Pinheiro (born 13 June 1945) is a French film director, editor and writer.

Filmography

References

External links 

1945 births
Living people
French film directors